TrackingPoint is an applied technology company based in Austin, Texas. In 2011, it created a long-range rifle system that was the first precision guided firearm.

Formed by John McHale in February 2011, the company created its first PGF prototype in March 2011. The company offered its first product in January 2013 and a second, the AR Series semi-automatic smart rifle, in January 2014.

Variants of the company's bolt-action rifles use .338 Lapua Magnum and .300 Winchester Magnum ammunition. Semi-automatic variants are available in 7.62 NATO, 5.56 NATO and .300 BLK.

It can also acquire and hit targets traveling at  within 2.5 seconds. It can be used with the company's ShotGlass wearable glasses that transmits what the scope is seeing to the shooter's eye.

In January 2014, the U.S. Army purchased six TrackingPoint fire control systems to begin exploring purported key target acquisition and aiming technologies. The Army has integrated the system onto the XM2010 Enhanced Sniper Rifle for military testing.

Weighing , it can fire Hornady ammunition; the 147gr ELD-M (a match type bullet) or the 143gr ELD-X (designed for hunting).

In November 2018, Talon Precision Optics, of Jacksonville, Florida, bought TrackingPoint.

Technology

TrackingPoint's precision guided firearms system uses several component technologies:
Networked Tracking Scope: The core engine that tracks the target, calculates range and the ballistic solution, and works in concert with the shooter and guided trigger to release the shot.
Barrel Reference System: A fixed reference point that enables the networked tracking scope to make adjustments and retain zero over time. The barrel reference system is factory calibrated to a laser reference. 
Guided to Trigger: The rifle's trigger is hard-wired to the networked tracking scope. The networked tracking scope controls the trigger weight to eliminate trigger squeeze and shot timing errors.
Field Software Upgradeable: Software can be uploaded to the scope to add capability.
Heads Up Display (HUD): The HUD indicates range, wind, reticle, video storage gauge, zoom, and battery life, plus LRF icon, Wi-Fi on/off icon, compass icon, can't wheel, inclination wheels and off-screen indicators.
Recording: An integrated camera captures video and still images from the networked tracking scope and heads up display. Recorded images can be downloaded to a smartphone or tablet from the scope and transmitted via email or social media.

Vulnerabilities 
In 2017, computer security experts Runa Sandvik and Michael Auger demonstrated that naive software design left the rifle's aiming computer open to remote hacking when its Wi-Fi capability was turned on. A skilled hacker could acquire root access and brick the computer.

References

External links 
 TrackingPoint website.
 
 

Companies based in Austin, Texas
Software companies based in Texas
Companies established in 2011
Firearm manufacturers of the United States
Software companies of the United States